Sidorenko's conjecture is a conjecture in the field of graph theory, posed by Alexander Sidorenko in 1986. Formally, it provides an intuitive inequality about graph homomorphism densities in graphons.

Statement

Let  be a graph. Then  is said to have Sidorenko's property if, for all graphons , the inequality
 

Sidorenko's conjecture (1986) states that every bipartite graph has Sidorenko's property.

This is not a surprising conjecture because the right hand side of the inequality is the probability of the mapping being a homomorphism if each edge map is independent. So one should expect the two sides to be at least of the same order. The natural extension to graphons would follow from the fact that every graphon is the limit point of some sequence of graphs.

The requirement that  is bipartite to have Sidorenko's property is necessary — if  is a bipartite graph, then  since  is triangle-free. A similar argument shows that no graph with an odd cycle has Sidorenko's property. Since a graph is bipartite if and only if it has no odd cycles, this implies that the only possible graphs that can have Sidorenko's property are bipartite graphs.

Equivalent formulation

Sidorenko's property is equivalent to the following reformulation:

Examples

As previously noted, to prove Sidorenko's property it suffices to demonstrate the inequality for all graphs . Throughout this section,  is a graph on  vertices with average degree .

Elementary proofs of Sidorenko's property for some graphs follow from the Cauchy–Schwarz inequality or Hölder's inequality.

Cauchy–Schwarz: The 4-cycle C4

 
by the Cauchy–Schwarz inequality. The sum has now become a count of all pairs of vertices and their common neighbors, which is the same as the count of all vertices and pairs of their neighbors. So
 
by Cauchy–Schwarz again. So
 
as desired.

Spectral graph theory: The 2k-cycle C2k

However, one can apply spectral graph theory to prove that all even cycles have Sidorenko's property. Note that odd cycles are not accounted for in Sidorenko's conjecture because they are not bipartite.

 
But then
 
because the eigenvalues of a real symmetric matrix are real. So
 
as desired.

Entropy: Paths of length 3

J.L. Xiang Li and Balázs Szegedy (2011) introduced the idea of using entropy to prove some cases of Sidorenko's conjecture. Szegedy (2015) later applied the ideas further to prove that an even wider class of bipartite graphs have Sidorenko's property. While Szegedy's proof wound up being abstract and technical, Tim Gowers and Jason Long reduced the argument to a simpler one for specific cases such as paths of length . In essence, the proof chooses a nice probability distribution of choosing the vertices in the path and applies Jensen's inequality (i.e. convexity) to deduce the inequality.

Partial results

Here is a list of some bipartite graphs  which have been shown to have Sidorenko's property. Let  have bipartition .

 Paths have Sidorenko's property, as shown by Mulholland and Smith in 1959 (before Sidorenko formulated the conjecture).
 Trees have Sidorenko's property, generalizing paths. This was shown by Sidorenko in a 1991 paper.
 Cycles of even length have Sidorenko's property as previously shown. Sidorenko also demonstrated this in his 1991 paper.
 Complete bipartite graphs have Sidorenko's property. This was also shown in Sidorenko's 1991 paper.
 Bipartite graphs with  have Sidorenko's property. This was also shown in Sidorenko's 1991 paper.
 Hypercube graphs (generalizations of ) have Sidorenko's property, as shown by Hatami in 2008.
 More generally, norming graphs (as introduced by Hatami) have Sidorenko's property.
This proof used the dependent random choice method.
 For all bipartite graphs , there is some positive integer  such that the -blow-up of  has Sidorenko's property. This was shown by Conlon and Lee in 2018.
 Some recursive approaches have been attempted, which take a collection of graphs that have Sidorenko's property to create a new graph that has Sidorenko's property. The main progress in this manner was done by Sidorenko in his 1991 paper, Li and Szegedy in 2011, and Kim, Lee, and Lee in 2013.
 Li and Szegedy's paper also used entropy methods to prove the property for a class of graphs called "reflection trees."
 Kim, Lee, and Lee's paper extended this idea to a class of graphs with a tree-like substructure called "tree-arrangeable graphs."

However, there are graphs for which Sidorenko's conjecture is still open. An example is the "Möbius strip" graph , formed by removing a -cycle from the complete bipartite graph with parts of size .

László Lovász proved a local version of Sidorenko's conjecture, i.e. for graphs that are "close" to random graphs in a sense of cut norm.

Forcing conjecture

A sequence of graphs  is called quasi-random with density  for some density  if for every graph ,
 
The sequence of graphs would thus have properties of the Erdős–Rényi random graph .

From Chung, Graham, and Wilson's 1989 paper about quasi-random graphs, it suffices for the  count to match what would be expected of a random graph (i.e. the condition holds for ). The paper also asks which graphs  have this property besides . Such graphs are called forcing graphs as their count controls the quasi-randomness of a sequence of graphs.

The forcing conjecture states the following:
 A graph  is forcing if and only if it is bipartite and not a tree.
It is straightforward to see that if  is forcing, then it is bipartite and not a tree. Some examples of forcing graphs are even cycles (shown by Chung, Graham, and Wilson). Skokan and Thoma showed that all complete bipartite graphs that are not trees are forcing.

Sidorenko's conjecture for graphs of density  follows from the forcing conjecture. Furthermore, the forcing conjecture would show that graphs that are close to equality in Sidorenko's property must satisfy quasi-randomness conditions.

See also 

 Common graph

References 

Graph theory
Conjectures